"White Knuckle Ride" is the first single from British alternative group Jamiroquai's studio album Rock Dust Light Star. The single was released via Digital Download on 31 October 2010, with a Limited Edition Vinyl release due to appear on 1 January 2011. The song was written by band frontman Jay Kay and Matt Johnson and produced by Kay. It is the band's first record to be released under Mercury Records.

The band's official website originally announced that the single would be released on 11 October. The band describe "White Knuckle Ride" as "a hi-octane retrospective on Jay's career experiences – a cautionary tale equally applicable to anyone's life in these pressure cooker times." It appears that the Jamiroquai logo typeface has been stretched vertically for this release. The video for the single was made available on the group's YouTube account on 25 September.  The single charted at No.39 in the UK Singles Chart and as of 2021, remains their last UK Top 40 hit.

Music video
The music video showed Jay Kay pursuing a Porsche 911 Carrera RS 2.7 along a winding desert road from a helicopter. After several unsuccessful attempts at losing its pursuer – including driving in wide circuits to raise a cloud of dust to blind Kay, and taking a detour down a tree-lined dirt road – the driver comes to a halt under a viaduct and escapes on foot. Kay arrives to find the car abandoned with no sign of the driver, whose face is never shown. The helicopter is a Robinson R44 Raven 2 owned by Jay Kay, who is a qualified private helicopter pilot, however a stunt pilot was used for some scenes.

The video was filmed on the Tabernas Desert, in Almeria, Spain and was directed by Howard Greenhalgh.

Track listing
 Digital Download
 "White Knuckle Ride" – 3:35

Remixes

Seamus Haji Mixes
 "White Knuckle Ride (Seamus Haji Remix)" – 6:40
 "White Knuckle Ride (Seamus Haji Dub)" – 6:40
 "White Knuckle Ride (Seamus Haji Radio Edit)" – 3:00
 Alan Braxe Mixes
 "White Knuckle Ride (Alan Braxe Remix)" – 6:16 
 "White Knuckle Ride (Alan Braxe Radio Edit)" – 3:16 
 Penguin Prison Mixes
 "White Knuckle Ride (Penguin Prison Remix)" – 5:37
 "White Knuckle Ride (Penguin Prison Dub)" – 5:30
 Monarchy  Mixes
 "White Knuckle Ride (Monarchy Remix)" – 7:00
 "White Knuckle Ride (Monarchy Dub)" – 6:45

Live performances
 The X Factor UK – 31 October 2010: Week 3 Results Show (Alongside Rihanna and Bon Jovi)
 The X Factor Australia – 13 December 2010: The Final

Charts

Weekly charts

Year-end charts

Certifications

References

Jamiroquai songs
2010 singles
Songs written by Jason Kay
Number-one singles in Italy
Songs written by Matt Johnson (keyboardist)
2010 songs
Mercury Records singles
Dance-pop songs
Disco songs
House music songs
Music videos directed by Howard Greenhalgh